

In seismology and other areas involving elastic waves, S waves, secondary waves, or shear waves (sometimes called elastic S waves) are a type of elastic wave and are one of the two main types of elastic body waves, so named because they move through the body of an object, unlike surface waves.

S waves are transverse waves, meaning that the direction of particle motion of a S wave is perpendicular to the direction of wave propagation, and the main restoring force comes from shear stress. Therefore, S waves cannot propagate in liquids with zero (or very low) viscosity; however, they may propagate in liquids with high viscosity.  

The name secondary wave comes from the fact that they are the second type of wave to be detected by an earthquake seismograph, after the compressional primary wave, or P wave, because S waves travel more slowly in solids. Unlike P waves, S waves cannot travel through the molten outer core of the Earth, and this causes a shadow zone for S waves opposite to their origin. They can still propagate through the solid inner core: when a P wave strikes the boundary of molten and solid cores at an oblique angle, S waves will form and propagate in the solid medium. When these S waves hit the boundary again at an oblique angle, they will in turn create P waves that propagate through the liquid medium. This property allows seismologists to determine some physical properties of the Earth's inner core.

History
In 1830, the mathematician Siméon Denis Poisson presented to the French Academy of Sciences an essay ("memoir") with a theory of the propagation of elastic waves in solids. In his memoir, he states that an earthquake would produce two different waves: one having a certain speed  and the other having a speed . At a sufficient distance from the source, when they can be considered plane waves in the region of interest, the first kind consists of expansions and compressions in the direction perpendicular to the wavefront (that is, parallel to the wave's direction of motion); while the second consists of stretching motions occurring in directions parallel to the front (perpendicular to the direction of motion).

Theory

Isotropic medium
For the purpose of this explanation, a solid medium is considered isotropic if its strain (deformation) in response to stress is the same in all directions. Let  be the displacement vector of a particle of such a medium from its "resting" position  due elastic vibrations, understood to be a function of the rest position  and time . The deformation of the medium at that point can be described by the strain tensor , the 3×3 matrix whose elements are

where  denotes partial derivative with respect to position coordinate . The strain tensor is related to the 3×3 stress tensor  by the equation

It follows that

From Newton's law of inertia, one also gets

where  is the density (mass per unit volume) of the medium at that point, and  denotes partial derivative with respect to time. Combining the last two equations one gets the seismic wave equation in homogeneous media

Using the nabla operator notation of vector calculus, with some approximations, this equation can be written as

Taking the curl of this equation and applying vector identities, one gets

This formula is the wave equation applied to the vector quantity , which is the material's shear strain. Its solutions, the S waves, are linear combinations of sinusoidal plane waves of various wavelengths and directions of propagation, but all with the same speed 

Taking the divergence of seismic wave equation in homogeneous media, instead of the curl, yields a wave equation describing propagation of the quantity , which is the material's compression strain. The solutions of this equation, the P waves, travel at the speed  that is more than twice the speed  of S waves.

The steady state SH waves are defined by the Helmholtz equation

where  is the wave number.

See also
 Earthquake Early Warning (Japan)
 Lamb waves
 Longitudinal wave
 Love wave
 P wave
 Rayleigh wave
 Seismic wave
 Shear wave splitting

References

Further reading

Waves
Seismology